Ioannis Triantafyllidis (born 7 September 1965) is a Greek alpine skier. He competed in two events at the 1984 Winter Olympics.

References

External links
 

1965 births
Living people
Greek male alpine skiers
Olympic alpine skiers of Greece
Alpine skiers at the 1984 Winter Olympics
Sportspeople from Veria